Lambek may refer to:

 Joachim Lambek (1922–2014), professor of pure mathematics at McGill University.
 Lambek–Moser theorem, a combinatorial number theory.
 Michael Lambek (born 1950), professor of anthropology at the University of Toronto Scarborough.